Hidenobu Yonekura (born 1 May 1997) is a Japanese artistic gymnast. He is the 2021 World Artistic Gymnastics Championships silver medalist in Vault. His first international success was at the 2019 World Cup where he won gold in the vault event in Szombathely. In the 2019 World Cup he won another gold in vault at Doha.

Competitive history

References 

Living people
1997 births
Japanese male artistic gymnasts
Sportspeople from Hiroshima
Medalists at the World Artistic Gymnastics Championships
20th-century Japanese people
21st-century Japanese people